The Ministry for Kosovo and Metohija was the ministry in the Government of Serbia responsible for the issues relating to Kosovo and Metohija.

History
The ministry was formed on 7 July 2008, taking over the jurisdictions of disbanded Coordination Center for Kosovo and Metohija. It was abolished on 27 July 2012 after the formation of the Office for Kosovo and Metohija, while also one minister without portfolio was in charge for the issues that were in charge of the abolished ministry.

List of ministers
Political Party:

See also
 Office for Kosovo and Metohija

References

External links
 Serbian ministries, etc – Rulers.org

Defunct government ministries of Serbia
2008 establishments in Serbia
2012 disestablishments in Serbia
Ministries established in 2008
Ministries disestablished in 2012
Autonomous Province of Kosovo and Metohija
Kosovo–Serbia relations